Calohypsibiidae is a family of tardigrades belonging to the order Parachela.

Genera:
 Calohypsibius Thulin, 1928
 Haplohexapodibius Pilato & Beasley, 1987
 Haplomacrobiotus May, 1948
 Hexapodibius Pilato, 1969
 Parhexapodibius Pilato, 1969

References

Parachela (tardigrade)
Tardigrade families